This is a list of notable Louisiana Creole people.

To be included in this list, the person must have a Wikipedia article showing they are Louisiana Creoles or must have references showing they are Louisiana Creoles and are notable.

List

Arts, culture, and entertainment

Don Albert (1908–1980) – jazz trumpeter and bandleader
Veronica Porché Ali (born 1955) – actress and psychologist and the former wife of boxing legend Muhammad Ali
Debbie Allen (born 1950) – actress, dancer, choreographer, television director, television producer, member of the President's Committee on the Arts and Humanities
Fernest Arceneaux (1940–2008) – zydeco accordionist and singer from Louisiana
Alphonse "Bois Sec" Ardoin (1915–2007) – accordionist
Amede Ardoin (1898–1942) – zydeco musician
Chris Ardoin (born 1981) – zydeco accordionist and singer
Sean Ardoin (born 1970) – zydeco musician and singer
K.D. Aubert (born 1978) – actress and fashion model
Vernel Bagneris (born 1949) – playwright, actor, director, singer, and dancer; named after his cousin Vernel Fournier
Louis Barbarin (1902–1997) – New Orleans jazz drummer
Paul Barbarin (1899–1969) – New Orleans jazz drummer, usually regarded (along with Baby Dodds) as one of the best of the pre-Big Band era jazz drummers
Achille Baquet (1885–1955) – jazz clarinetist and saxophonist
George Baquet (1881–1949) – jazz clarinetist, known for his contributions to early jazz in New Orleans
Blue Lu Barker (1913–1998) – jazz and blues singer; her better known recordings included "Don't You Feel My Leg" and "Look What Baby's Got For You"
Danny Barker (1909–1994) – jazz banjoist, singer, guitarist, songwriter, ukulele player
Richmond Barthé (1901–1989) – sculptor
Dave Bartholomew (1918–2019) – musician, band leader, composer and arranger, prominent in the music of New Orleans throughout the second half of the 20th century
Jon Batiste (born 1986) – singer, multi-instrumentalist, educator, and bandleader from Kenner, Louisiana; music director and bandleader for The Late Show with Stephen Colbert and its band Stay Human
Lionel Batiste (1931–2012) – jazz and blues musician and singer from New Orleans
Sidney Bechet (1897–1959) – jazz saxophonist, clarinetist and composer

Troian Bellisario (born 1985) – actress; stars as Spencer Hastings in the ABC Family series Pretty Little Liars
E.J. Bellocq (1873–1949) – photographer
Jimmy Bertrand (1900–1960) – jazz and blues drummer
Alex Bigard (1899–1978) – jazz drummer. He was the brother of Barney Bigard and a cousin of Natty Dominique and A.J. Piron, and was involved for decades with the New Orleans jazz scene.

Barney Bigard (1906–1980) – jazz clarinetist
Esther Bigeou (1895–1936) – blues singer; billed as "The Girl with the Million Dollar Smile"; one of the classic female blues singers popular in the 1920s
Eddie Bo (1930–2009) – singer and pianist from New Orleans
Peter Bocage (1887–1967) – cornet player; also played violin professionally, as well as sometimes trombone, banjo, and xylophone; cousin of New Orleans R&B musician Eddie Bo
Denise Boutte (born 1982) – actress and model 
John Boutté (born 1958) – jazz singer
Wellman Braud (1891–1966) – jazz upright bassist
John Brunious (born 1940) – jazz trumpeter
Wendell Brunious (born 1954) – jazz trumpeter
Calvin Carriere (1921–2002) – fiddler
Chubby Carrier (born 1967) – zydeco musician
Roy Carrier (1947–2010) – zydeco musician
Inez Catalon (c. 1913–1994) – Creole singer
Papa Celestin (1884–1954) – jazz bandleader, trumpeter, cornetist and vocalist
Leah Chase (1923–2019) – chef, author and television personality
Boozoo Chavis (1930–2001) – musician and one of the pioneers of zydeco music
Clifton Chenier (1925–1987) – zydeco musician
C.J. Chenier (born 1957) – zydeco musician and son of the Grammy Award-winning "King of Zydeco", Clifton Chenier
Frank Christian (1887–1973) – early jazz trumpeter
Savannah Churchill (1920–1974) – singer of pop, jazz, and blues music
Robert Colescott (1925–2009) – painter
Warrington Colescott (1921–2018) – artist
Florestine Perrault Collins (1895–1988) – photographer
Charles Connor (1935–2021) – drummer, best known as a member of Little Richard's band
Louis Cottrell, Jr. (1911–1978) – jazz clarinetist and tenor saxophonist
Coline Creuzot (born 1985) – singer and Sony ATV songwriter; granddaughter of Percy Creuzot Jr, founder of Frenchy's Chicken, a popular creole restaurant chain based in Houston
Joe Darensbourg (1906–1985) – jazz clarinetist and saxophonist notable for his work with Buddy Petit, Jelly Roll Morton, Charlie Creath, Fate Marable, Andy Kirk, Kid Ory, Wingy Manone, Joe Liggins and Louis Armstrong
Damita Jo DeBlanc (1930–1998) – actress, comedian, and lounge music performer 
Edmonde Dede (1829–1903) – composer

Edgar Degas (1834–1917) – artist famous for his paintings, sculptures, prints, and drawings; cousin of Norbert Rillieux; eldest of five children of Célestine Musson De Gas, a Creole from New Orleans, and Augustin De Gas, a banker
Harold Dejan (1909–2002) – jazz alto saxophonist and bandleader

Geno Delafose (born 1972) – zydeco accordionist
John Delafose (1939–1994) – zydeco accordionist
Louis Nelson Delisle (1885–1949) – Dixieland jazz clarinetist
Brandon DeShazer (born 1984) – actor, model
Sidney Desvigne (1893–1959) – jazz trumpeter.
Faith Domergue (1924–1999) – television and film actress
Natty Dominique (1896–1982) – jazz trumpeter
Fats Domino (1928–2017) – classic R&B and rock and roll singer, songwriter and pianist
Rockin' Dopsie (1932–1993) – leading zydeco musician and button accordion player who enjoyed popular success first in Europe and later in the United States
Peter DuConge (1903–1967) – jazz reedist
Lawrence Duhe (1887–1960) – jazz clarinetist and bandleader; member of Sugar Johnnie's New Orleans Creole Orchestra
Honore Dutrey (1894–1934) – Dixieland jazz trombonist
Ava DuVernay (born 1972) – film director, producer, screenwriter
Sheila E. (born 1957) – percussionist, singer, composer and producer
Mignon Faget (born 1933) – jewelry designer based in her native New Orleans
Lionel Ferbos (1911–2014) – New Orleans jazz trumpeter
Lil' Fizz (born 1985) – rapper, former B2K member
Canray Fontenot (1922–1995) – fiddle player
Vernel Fournier (1928–2000) – jazz drummer
D'Jalma Garnier (born 1954) – musician and composer
Tony Garnier (born 1956) – bassist (both double bass and bass guitar), best known as an accompanist to Bob Dylan, with whom he has played since 1989
Virginie Amelie Avegno Gautreau (1859–1915) – model and socialite
Louis Moreau Gottschalk (1829–1869) – composer and pianist, known as a virtuoso performer of his own romantic piano pieces
George Guesnon (1907–1968) – jazz banjoist, guitarist, composer, and singer

George Herriman (1880–1944) – cartoonist, known for his comic strip Krazy Kat
Andrew Hilaire (1899–1935) – jazz drummer
Marques Houston (born 1981) – singer and actor

Julien Hudson (1811–1844) – painter and art teacher
Clementine Hunter (1886–1988) – self-taught folk artist from the Cane River region in Louisiana

Ice-T (born 1958) – musician, actor
Queen Ida (born 1929) – zydeco accordion player
Michelle Jacques – singer and music educator
Illinois Jacquet (1922–2004) – jazz tenor saxophonist, best remembered for his solo on "Flying Home", critically recognized as the first R&B saxophone solo
Russell Jacquet (1917–1990) – trumpeter. He was the elder brother of well-known tenor saxophonist Illinois Jacquet, who he worked with through the years.
Al Jarreau (1940–2017) – singer and musician. He received a total of seven Grammy Awards and was nominated for over a dozen more. Jarreau is perhaps best known for his 1981 album Breakin' Away.
Beau Jocque (1953–1999) – zydeco musician
Beverly Johnson (born 1952) – model, actress, and businesswoman
Ty Granderson Jones (born 1964) – actor, screenwriter and producer
Leatrice Joy (1893–1985) – actress most prolific during the silent film era
Ernie K-Doe (1936–2001) – R&B singer best known for his 1961 hit single "Mother-in-Law" which went to No. 1 on the Billboard pop chart in the U.S.
Freddie Keppard (1890–1993) – jazz cornetist

Beyoncé Knowles (born 1981) – R&B singer
Solange Knowles (born 1986) – R&B singer
Tina Knowles (born 1954) – fashion designer
The Knux (born 1982 & 1984) – musicians, rappers, singers, record producers
Dorothy LaBostrie (1929–2007) – songwriter, best known for co-writing Little Richard's 1955 hit "Tutti Frutti"
Lenny LaCour (born 1932) – record producer, songwriter and performer, particularly active from the mid-1950s to the mid-1970s
Dorothy Lamour (1914–1996) – actress and singer
Vilayna LaSalle – model
Charles Lucien Lambert (1828–1896) – pianist and composer
Lucien-Léon Guillaume Lambert (1858–1945) – pianist and composer
Sidney Lambert (born 1838) – pianist and composer
Carmen De Lavallade (born 1931) – choreographer, actress
Bianca Lawson (born 1979) – film and television actress; known for roles in the television series Saved by the Bell: The New Class, Goode Behavior and Pretty Little Liars; had recurring roles in the series Sister, Sister, Buffy the Vampire Slayer, The Steve Harvey Show, Dawson's Creek, The Secret Life of the American Teenager, The Vampire Diaries, and Teen Wolf
Sabrina Le Beauf (born 1958) – actress; played Sandra on the television series The Cosby Show
Jeni Le Gon (1916–2012) – dancer, dance instructor, and actress

Rosie Ledet (born 1971) – zydeco singer and accordion player
Harry Lennix (born 1964) – actor; best known for his roles as Terrence "Dresser" Williams in the Robert Townsend film The Five Heartbeats and as Boyd Langton in the Joss Whedon television series Dollhouse
George Lewis (1900–1968) – jazz clarinetist
Jules Lion (1809–1866) – photographer
Branford Marsalis (born 1960) – saxophonist, composer and bandleader
Wynton Marsalis (born 1961) – jazz trumpeter, composer and bandleader

Tristin Mays (born 1990) – actress and singer; played Shaina in the Nickelodeon series Gullah Gullah Island and Robin Dixon in Alias
Victor-Eugene McCarty (born between 1817 and 1823) – composer
Rocky McKeon – musician

Adah Isaacs Menken (1835–1868) – actress, painter, poet
Michel'le (born 1970)  – R&B singer, former girlfriend of Dr. Dre; married to Suge Knight
Janee Michelle (born 1946) – actress, model, and businessperson best known for her role in the 1974 horror film The House on Skull Mountain
Lizzie Miles (1895–1963) – blues singer
Ziggy Modeliste (born 1948) – drummer best known as a founding member of the funk group The Meters
Allison Montana (1922–2005) – New Orleans cultural icon who acted as the Mardi Gras Indian "chief of chiefs" for over 50 years
Deacon John Moore (born 1941) – blues, rhythm and blues and rock and roll musician, singer, and bandleader
Morris W. Morris (1845–1906) – American Civil War soldier of the Louisiana Native Guards; stage actor
Jelly Roll Morton (1885–1941) – virtuoso pianist, bandleader and composer
Archibald Motley (1891–1981) – painter
Idris Muhammad (1939–2014) – jazz drummer who recorded extensively with many musicians, including Ahmad Jamal, Lou Donaldson, Pharoah Sanders, and Tete Montoliu.
Aaron Neville (born 1941) – soul and R&B singer and musician.
Albert Nicholas (1900–1973) – jazz reed player
Wooden Joe Nicholas (1883–1957) – jazz trumpeter and cornetist, active in the early New Orleans jazz scene
Jimmie Noone (1895–1944) – jazz clarinetist and bandleader
Brittany O'Grady (born 1996) – actress who plays Simone Davis on the TV series Star
Kid Ory (1886–1973) – jazz trombonist and bandleader
Jimmy Palao (1879–1925) – jazz bandleader
Ernest "Doc" Paulin (1907–2007) – jazz trumpeter and bandleader
Alcide Pavageau (1888–1969) – jazz guitarist and double-bassist
Manuel Perez (1871–1946) – clarinetist and bandleader
Buddie Petit (1890–1931) – early jazz cornetist
Joseph Petit (1873–1945) – jazz trombonist
Fats Pichon (1906–1967) – jazz pianist, singer, bandleader, and songwriter
Alphonse Picou (1878–1961) – jazz clarinetist
De De Pierce (1904–1973) – trumpeter and cornetist; best remembered for the songs "Peanut Vendor" and "Dippermouth Blues", both with Billie Pierce
Armand J. Piron (1888–1943) – jazz violinist, band leader, and composer
Deborah Pratt (born 1951) – actress, writer and television producer
Regis Prograis (born 1989) – professional boxer 
Prince (1958–2016) – musician
Wardell Quezergue (1930–2011) – music arranger, producer, and bandleader
Phylicia Rashād (born 1948) – Tony Award-winning actress and singer, best known for her role as Clair Huxtable on the long-running NBC sitcom The Cosby Show
Chris Rene (born 1982) – singer-songwriter, musician and producer from Santa Cruz, California
Googie Rene (1927–2007) – musician and songwriter
Leon Rene (1902–1982) – music composer of R&B and rock and roll songs in the 1930s, 1940s, and 1950s
Dawn Richard (1983) – singer-songwriter
Robert Ri'chard (born 1983) – actor

Nicole Richie (born 1981) – television personality, fashion designer
LaTavia Roberson (born 1981) – singe-songwriter, and actress
Joe Robichaux (1900–1965) – jazz pianist; nephew of John Robichaux
John Robichaux (1866–1939) – jazz bandleader, drummer, and violinist; uncle of Joseph Robichaux
RuPaul (born 1960) – actor, drag queen, model, author, television personality, and recording artist
Betye Saar (born 1926) – artist known for her work in the field of assemblage
Brytni Sarpy (born 1987) – actress best known for her portrayal of Valerie Spencer on the ABC Daytime soap opera General Hospital
Rockin' Sidney (1938–1998) – R&B, zydeco, and soul musician
Omer Simeon (1902–1959) – jazz clarinetist

Terrance Simien (born 1965) – zydeco musician, vocalist, and songwriter
Lil' Buck Sinegal (1944–2019) – blues and zydeco musician
Roger Guenveur Smith (born 1955) – actor, director, and writer
Betty Reid Soskin (born 1921) – Park Ranger with the National Park Service, assigned to the Rosie the Riveter/World War II Home Front National Historical Park in Richmond, California
Tracie Spencer (born 1976) – R&B and pop singer-songwriter, actress, and model
David Starfire – producer, composer, multi-instrumentalist and DJ based in Los Angeles and San Francisco
Johnny St. Cyr (1890–1966) – jazz banjoist and guitarist
Raven-Symoné (born 1985) – actress and singer
William J. Tennyson Jr. (1923–1959) – jazz musician
Andre Thierry (born 1979) – Grammy-nominated zydeco musician; leads the band Zydeco Magic
Lorenzo Tio Jr. (1893–1933) – jazz clarinetist
Allen Toussaint (1938–2015) – musician, composer, record producer, and influential figure in New Orleans R&B
Mr. T (born 1952) – actor known for his roles as B. A. Baracus in the 1980s television series The A-Team and as boxer Clubber Lang in the 1982 film Rocky III, and for his appearances as a professional wrestler
Vicki Vann (born 1980) – country music artist, model and actress
Little Walter (1930–1968) – blues musician and singer
Lynn Whitfield (born 1953) – actress
Nathan Williams (born 1964) – zydeco accordionist and singer
Buckwheat Zydeco (1947–2016) – accordionist and zydeco musician

Business

Danny Bakewell (born 1946) – civil rights activist and entrepreneur; owner of the Bakewell Company, which includes among its holdings the New Orleans radio station WBOK and the Los Angeles Sentinel newspaper; Chairman of the National Newspaper Publishers Association 
Alvin J. Boutte (1929–2012) — founder and CEO of the largest Black-owned bank in the United States, civil rights activist, Chicago civic leader
Joseph Eloi Broussard (1866–1956) – pioneer rice grower and miller in Texas
Jean Pierre Chouteau (1758–1849) – fur trader, merchant, politician and slaveholder
Marie Couvent (1757–1837) – philanthropist and businesswoman
Percy Creuzot (1924–2010) – restaurateur who founded Frenchy's Chicken in Houston, Texas; due to his success, he became known as "the black Colonel Sanders"
Constant C. Dejoie, Sr. (1881–1970) – publisher and founder of The Louisiana Weekly newspaper
Lurita Doan (born 1958) – businesswoman, political commentator, and former political appointee; administrator of the United States General Services Administration, the government's contracting agency, 2006–2008, during the administration of Republican U.S. President George W. Bush 
Harold Doley (born 1947) – businessman
Jean Baptiste Point du Sable (?–1818) – businessman and founder of Chicago
Roy F. Guste – author of ten Louisiana French-Creole cuisine cookbooks; fifth-generation proprietor of New Orleans' famed Antoine's Restaurant, established in 1840
Thomy Lafon (1810–1893) – businessman, philanthropist, and human rights activist
Austin Leslie (1934–2005) – internationally famous New Orleans chef whose work defined "Creole Soul"
Miriam Leslie (1836–1914) – publisher and author
Marie Thérèse Coincoin (1742–1816) – médecine, planter, and businesswoman in Natchitoches Parish
Baroness Micaela Almonester de Pontalba (1795–1874) – businesswoman
Mary Ellen Pleasant (between 1814 and 1817–1904) – entrepreneur and human rights activist
Iris Rideau (born 1937) – winemaker, businesswoman and activist
Charles Rochon (1673–1733) – French colonist and was one of the four founders of modern-day Mobile, Alabama.
Rosette Rochon (1767) – daughter of Pierre Rochon, a shipbuilder from a Québécois family (family name was Rocheron in Québec), and his mulâtresse slave-consort Marianne, who bore him five other children. Rochon came to speculate in real estate in the French Quarter; she eventually owned rental property, opened grocery stores, made loans, bought and sold mortgages, and owned and rented out (hired out) slaves.
Desiree Rogers (born 1959) – former White House Social Secretary and businesswoman
Peter A. Sarpy (1804–1865) – businessman
Jacques Telesphore Roman (1800–1848) – businessman
Virginie de Ternant (1818–1887) – businesswoman

Education

Earl Barthe (1922–2010) –  plasterer and plastering historian
Brian J. Costello (born 1966) – historian, author, archivist and humanitarian. He is an 11th generation resident of New Roads, Louisiana, seat of Pointe Coupee Parish. He is three-quarters French and one-quarter Italian in ethnicity. He is a recognized, and one of the few remaining, speakers of Louisiana Creole French, having been immersed in childhood in the dialect spoken in Pointe Coupee Parish.
Toi Derricotte (born 1941) – poet and a professor of writing at the University of Pittsburgh
Edouard Dessommes (1845–1908) – French language writer
Caroline Durieux (1896–1989) – lithographer, and Professor Emeritus of Fine Arts at Louisiana State University
Alcée Fortier (1856–1914) – late 19th-century professor of languages and folklore; influential in preservation of the French language in Louisiana
Norman Francis (born 1931) – President of Xavier University of Louisiana
Sheryl St. Germain (born 1954) – poet, essayist, and professor
Andrew Jolivette – author and lecturer; associate professor in American Indian Studies and instructor in Ethnic Studies, Educational Leadership, and Race and Resistance Studies at San Francisco State University
Sybil Kein – poet, playwright, scholar and musician
Suzette M. Malveaux (born 1966) – Professor of Law and former Associate Dean of Academic Affairs at the Columbus School of Law, Catholic University of America
Camille Nickerson (1888–1982) – pianist, composer, arranger, collector, and Howard University professor from 1926 to 1962
Etnah Rochon Boutte (1880-1973) — educator, pharmacist, an activist; executive secretary of the Circle for Negro War Relief; co-founder, NAACP Anti-Lynching Crusaders
Gilbert L. Rochon – 6th president of Tuskegee University, 2010–2013
Neal Ferdinand Simeon (1916–1963) – mechanical engineer and teacher

Journalism

Dean Baquet (born 1956) – Pulitzer Prize–winning journalist; executive editor of The New York Times
Chris Broussard (born 1968) – sports analyst for ESPN, who mainly covers the NBA; columnist for ESPN Magazine and ESPN.com; makes appearances on ESPN's NBA Fastbreak as an analyst
Merri Dee (born 1936) – philanthropist and former television journalist
Bryant Gumbel (born 1948) – television journalist
Greg Gumbel (born 1946) – television sportscaster
Aristide Laurent (1941–2011) – publisher and LGBT civil rights advocate; co-founded The Los Angeles Advocate (now known as The Advocate) in 1967 with Sam Allen, Bill Rau, and Richard Mitch
Charlie LeDuff (born 1966) – Pulitzer Prize-winning journalist and writer
Don Lemon (born 1966) – television news anchor; host of CNN Tonight
Suzanne Malveaux (born 1966) – television news reporter
Arthel Neville (born 1962) – journalist and television personality

Law and politics

Caesar Antoine (1836–1921) – Lieutenant Governor of Louisiana, businessman, soldier, editor
Larry Bagneris, Jr. (born 1946) – social and political activist from New Orleans
Sidney Barthelemy (born 1942) – former mayor of New Orleans
Armand Julie Beauvais (1783–1843) – 7th governor of Louisiana
Pierre Evariste Jean-Baptiste Bossier (1797–1844) – Louisiana state senator, 1833–1843; namesake of Bossier Parish, Louisiana
Henry Braden (1944–2013) – lawyer, lobbyist, and Democratic politician from his native New Orleans, Louisiana.
Donna Brazile (born 1959) – author, academic, and political analyst; Vice Chairwoman of the Democratic National Committee 
Allen Broussard (1929–1996) – judge who rose to become a justice of the California Supreme Court
LaToya Cantrell (born 1972) - current Mayor of New Orleans, Louisiana
Ward Connerly (born 1939) – former University of California regent, moderate conservative political activist, and businessman
Don Cravins, Jr. (born 1972) – Democratic politician from the State of Louisiana
Pierre Derbigny (1769–1829) – 6th governor of Louisiana

Dan Desdunes (1870–1929) – civil rights activist and musician in New Orleans and Omaha
Rodolphe Desdunes (1849–1928) – civil rights activist, poet, historian, journalist, and customs officer primarily active in New Orleans
Jean Noel Destrehan (1754–1823) – politician in Louisiana and one-time owner of Destréhan Plantation, one of Louisiana's most famous antebellum historical landmarks
Antoine Dubuclet (1810–1887) – State Treasurer of Louisiana
Jacques Dupre (1773–1846) – 8th Governor of Louisiana
Edwin Edwards (1927–2021) – served as the 50th governor of Louisiana for four terms (1972–1980, 1984–1988 and 1992–1996), twice as many elected terms as any other Louisiana chief executive

Keith Ellison (born 1963) – U.S. Representative for Minnesota's 5th congressional district
William Freret (1804–1864) – mayor of New Orleans, 1840–1842, and 1843–1844
Charles Gayarré (1805–1895) – lawyer, judge, politician, historian, essayist, dramatist and novelist
Curtis Graves (born 1938) – politician and photographer
Gizelle Graves  (born 1970) – model and reality TV star
Paul Octave Hebert (1818–1880) – 14th Governor of Louisiana from 1853 to 1856 and a general in the Confederate Army
Alexis Herman (born 1947) – politician; 23rd U.S. Secretary of Labor, serving under President Bill Clinton; previously Assistant to the President and Director of the White House Office of Public Engagement
Valerie Jarrett (born 1956) – senior advisor and assistant to the president for Public Engagement and Intergovernmental Affairs for the Obama administration; lawyer and businesswoman. Jerrett is a descendant of French colonist Charles Rochon
Paul Lafargue (1842–1911) – French revolutionary Marxist socialist journalist, literary critic, political writer and activist
Eric LaFleur (born 1964) – Democratic member of the Louisiana State Senate; first elected in 2007; previously member of the Louisiana House of Representatives for District 38 (Evangeline and St. Landry parishes), 2000–2008; first elected without opposition to an open seat vacated by Dirk Deville; re-elected four years later in 2003 with 81% of the vote
Mary Landrieu (born 1955) – politician, entrepreneur, and former U.S. Senator from the state of Louisiana.
Mitch Landrieu (born 1960) – politician and lawyer who is the 61st Mayor of New Orleans. A Democrat, Landrieu served as the 51st Lieutenant Governor of Louisiana from 2004 to 2010 prior to becoming mayor.
Moon Landrieu (born 1930) – served as the 56th Mayor of New Orleans from 1970 to 1978. He also is a former judge. He represented New Orleans' Twelfth Ward in the Louisiana House of Representatives from 1960 to 1966 and served on the New Orleans City Council as a member at-large from 1966 to 1970.
Pierre Caliste Landry (1841–1921) – Mayor of Donaldsonville, Louisiana
Richard W. Leche (1898–1965) – 44th governor of Louisiana, 1936–1939

Ivan L. R. Lemelle (born 1950) – United States federal judge
Bernard de Marigny (1785–1868) – politician
François Xavier Martin (1762–1846) – jurist and author, the first Attorney General of State of Louisiana, and longtime Justice of the Louisiana Supreme Court

John Willis Menard (1838–1893) – U.S. Congressman
Ernest Nathan Morial (1929–1989) – political figure and leading civil rights advocate
Marc Morial (born 1958) – former mayor of New Orleans; son of Ernest Nathan Morial
Ray Nagin (born 1956) – former mayor of New Orleans
Revius Ortique, Jr. (1924–2008) – justice of the Louisiana Supreme Court, and civil rights activist
Vincent Pierre (born 1964) – former businessman from Lafayette, Louisiana; Democratic member of the Louisiana House of Representatives for District 44; has represented a portion of Lafayette Parish since 2012
James Pitot (1761–1831) – second mayor of New Orleans
Homer Plessy (1863–1925) – plaintiff in the United States Supreme Court case Plessy v. Ferguson
Geronimo Pratt (1947–2011) – human rights activist
Denis Prieur – 10th mayor of New Orleans

Condoleezza Rice (born 1954) – 66th United States Secretary of State
Robert Rochon Taylor (1899-1957), housing activist and banker, first black member of the Chicago Housing Authority, namesake of the Robert Taylor Homes
Andre B. Roman (1795–1866) – 9th governor of Louisiana, cousin of Sen. Pierre Bossier
Angela Rye (born 1979) – attorney and political commentator, her paternal grandfather was born in Shreveport, Louisiana
A.P. Tureaud (1899–1972) – attorney for the New Orleans chapter of the NAACP
Jacques Villere (1761–1830) – 2nd governor of Louisiana
Joseph Marshall Walker (1784–1856) – 13th governor of Louisiana, 1850–1853
Lionel Wilson (1915–1998) – mayor of Oakland, California, serving three terms, 1977–1991
Andrew Young (born 1932) – Congressman from Georgia's 5th congressional district, United States Ambassador to the United Nations, and mayor of Atlanta

Literature

Arna Bontemps (1902–1973) – poet; noted member of the Harlem Renaissance
Anatole Broyard (1920–1990) – native of New Orleans, 20th-century writer and critic who worked in New York City
Kate Chopin (1850–1904) – author, forerunner to feminism
Marcus Bruce Christian (1900–1976) – poet, writer, historian and folklorist
Sidonie de la Houssaye (1820–1894) – writer
Armand Lanusse (1810–1867) – poet and educator
Willard Motley (1909–1965) – writer
Alice Dunbar Nelson (1875–1935) – poet, journalist and political activist
Anais Nin (1903–1977) – author
Brenda Marie Osbey (born 1957) – poet
John Kennedy Toole (1937–1969) – author; won a Pulitzer Prize for his Picaresque novel A Confederacy of Dunces (1980)
Jean Toomer (1894–1967) – poet and novelist
Victor Sejour (1817–1874) – writer
Fatima Shaik (born 1952) – writer of children's and adult literature
Jesmyn Ward (born 1977) – novelist and an associate professor of English at Tulane University. She won the 2011 National Book Award for Fiction and a 2012 Alex Award with her second novel Salvage the Bones, a story about familial love and community covering the 10 days preceding Hurricane Katrina, the day of the cyclone, and the day after.

Military

Edward Gabriel Andre Barrett (1827–1880) – Commodore in the United States Navy
P. G. T. Beauregard (1818–1893) – general for the Confederate States Army during the American Civil War; writer, civil servant and inventor
Renato Beluche (1780–1860) – Venezuelan merchant and privateer
Sherian Cadoria (born 1943) – retired General in the United States Army
Andre Cailloux (1825–1863) – officer in the Confederate and Union armies
Claire Lee Chennault (1893–1958) – military aviator
Jerome G. Cooper (born 1936) – former officer of the United States Marine Corps; Assistant Secretary of the Air Force (Manpower & Reserve Affairs), 1989–1992; United States Ambassador to Jamaica, 1994–1997
Russel L. Honoré (born 1947) – commanding general of the U.S. First Army in Fort Gillem, Georgia, and commander of Joint Task Force Katrina responsible for coordinating military relief efforts for Hurricane Katrina-affected areas across the Gulf Coast
John A. Lejeune (1867–1942) – 13th Commandant of the Marine Corps
Stephen W. Rochon – Rear Admiral; former Director of the Executive Residence; White House Chief Usher

Religion

Henriette Delille (1812–1862) – founder of the Sisters of the Holy Family, declared venerable by the Pope in 2010
Curtis J. Guillory (born 1943) – Bishop of the Roman Catholic Diocese of Beaumont, Texas
Marie Laveau (1794–1881) – practitioner of voodoo
Leonard Olivier (1923–2014) – retired auxiliary bishop for the Roman Catholic Archdiocese of Washington
Harold Robert Perry (1916–1991) – auxiliary bishop of the Archdiocese of New Orleans
John Ricard (born 1940) – prelate of the Roman Catholic Church; fourth Bishop of the Diocese of Pensacola-Tallahassee

Science and technology

John James Audubon (1785–1851) – ornithologist, naturalist, and painter
Dr. Moritz V. Craven (1928–2014) – Doctor of Dental Surgery, Master  of Public Health - became famous as one of the first Creoles to graduate from University of Texas School of Dentistry
Dr. Judith B Craven (born 1945) – Medical doctor. Became famous for ending epidemic in Houston, Texas as Director of the City of Houston Department of Public Health; Regent at University of Texas appointed by Gov. Rick Perry.
Antoine Philippe de Marigny (1721–1779) – geographer and explorer
Paul Du Chaillu (1831–1903) – French-American traveler, zoologist, and anthropologist; became famous in the 1860s as the first modern European outsider to confirm the existence of gorillas, and later the Pygmy people of central Africa; researched the prehistory of Scandinavia
Barthelemy Lafon (1769–1820) – notable Creole architect, engineer, city planner, and surveyor in New Orleans
Jean Alexandre LeMat (1824–1883) – best known for the percussion cap revolver that bears his name (LeMat revolver) 
Norbert Rillieux (1806–1894) – inventor and engineer
Jean-Louis Dolliole (1779–1861), architect-builder in New Orleans, Louisiana

Sports
Laila Ali (born 1977) – former professional boxer who competed from 1999 to 2007; daughter of the late heavyweight champion Muhammad Ali with his third wife, Veronica Porché Ali; the eighth of her father's nine children
Jonathan Babineaux (born 1981) - former defensive tackle for the National Football League
Jordan Babineaux (born 1983) - former safety for the National Football League
Daniel Cormier (born 1979) – mixed martial artist (UFC) and former Olympic wrestler
Jimmy Doyle (1924–1947) – welterweight boxer
Joe Dumars (born 1963) – retired basketball player in the National Basketball Association; played for the Detroit Pistons 1985–1999
Ralph Dupas (1935–2008) – boxer from New Orleans; won the world light middleweight championship
Brett Favre (born 1969) – Hall of Fame NFL Quarterback
Matt Forte (born 1985) – running back for the Chicago Bears of the National Football League
Jermaine Kearse (born 1990) – football player
Oliver Marcelle (1895–1949) – professional baseball player
Tyrann Mathieu (born 1992) – free safety for the Arizona Cardinals of the National Football League
Boyd Melson (born 1981) – light middleweight boxer
Paul Charles Morphy (1837–1884) – chess master, lawyer
Kelly Oubre Jr. (born 1995) – professional basketball player for the Phoenix Suns of the National Basketball Association (NBA)
Xavier Paul (born 1985) – professional baseball outfielder; has played in Major League Baseball (MLB) for the Los Angeles Dodgers, Pittsburgh Pirates, Cincinnati Reds and Arizona Diamondbacks
Regis Prograis (born 1989) – professional boxer from New Orleans, Louisiana. Prograis is currently the WBC interim light-welterweight champion.
Don Prudhomme (born 1941) – professional drag racer and 4-time NHRA Funny Car champion.
CC Sabathia (born 1980) – professional baseball pitcher for the New York Yankees
Paul Sentell (1879–1923) – professional baseball player

Other
Charles Deslondes (1777–1811) – one of the slave leaders of the 1811 German Coast uprising, a slave revolt that began on January 8, 1811, in the Territory of Orleans
Delphine LaLaurie (1787–1849) – socialite and murderer
Sinnamon Love (born 1973) – pornographic actress
Jean Saint Malo (d. 1784) – leader of a group of runaway slaves, known as maroons, in Spanish Louisiana
Lulu White (1868–1931) – brothel madam, procuress and entrepreneur in New Orleans during the Storyville period

See also

 List of Cajuns
 List of French Americans
 List of Haitian Americans

References

 02
Louisiana Creole
Creoles
Louisiana Creole
Louisiana Creoles, List
Louisiana Creole